Strickland Ketel (sometimes Strickland Kettle) is a civil parish in South Lakeland, Cumbria, England. In the 2001 census the parish had a population of 1,093, increasing at the 2011 census to 1,105. It borders the north west of Kendal, on both sides of the A591 road, and is also bordered by the parishes of Underbarrow and Bradleyfield to the south west, Crook to the west, Nether Staveley  to the north west, Strickland Roger to the north east, and Skelsmergh to the east.

There are 16 listed buildings or structures in the parish, all at grade II.

The parish includes the larger part of the village of Burneside, which straddles the border with Strickland Roger.

See also

Listed buildings in Strickland Ketel

References

Further reading

External links
 Cumbria County History Trust: Burneside (nb: provisional research only – see Talk page)

Civil parishes in Cumbria
South Lakeland District